Amar: With You Until the End of the World is a 2017 Spanish romantic drama film directed by Esteban Crespo. It stars María Pedraza and Pol Monen alongside Natalia Tena.

Plot 
Laura and Carlos love each other as if every day is their last. Driven by the desire to control her own life and break free from her mother's control, Laura dreams of getting pregnant. Both search for their place in this world, but one year later and a little more mature, their deep passion is just a memory.

Cast

Production 
Amar: With You Until the End of the World is Esteban Crespo's debut as a feature film director. The screenplay was penned by Crespo together with Mario Fernández Alonso. Stefan Schmitz and María Zamora were credited as producers. The film is a Avalon PC, Filmeu and Amar la Película AIE production, with the participation and support of TVE, ICAA, ICO, Filmin and Generalitat Valenciana.

Release 
The film was presented at the 20th Málaga Spanish Film Festival on 19 March 2017. Distributed by Avalon, it was theatrically released in Spain on 21 April 2017.

Accolades 

|-
| align = "center" rowspan = "2" | 2018 || 73rd CEC Medals || Best New Actor || Pol Monen ||  || 
|-
| 32nd Goya Awards || Best New Actor || Pol Monen ||  || 
|}

See also 
 List of Spanish films of 2017

References

External links
 

2017 films
Spanish romantic drama films
Avalon films
2010s Spanish-language films
2010s Spanish films